Éric Koechlin (November 11, 1950 – November 9, 2014) was a French slalom canoeist who competed from the late 1960s to the late 1970s. He won a bronze medal in the K-1 team event at the 1973 in Muotathal. Koechlin also finished 16th in the K-1 event at the 1972 Summer Olympics in Munich. He was at the end of his life a regional director of the Institut National du Sport et de l'Éducation Physique.

References

External links
 
 
 
 Eric Koechlin's obituary 

1950 births
2014 deaths
Canoeists at the 1972 Summer Olympics
French male canoeists
Olympic canoeists of France
Medalists at the ICF Canoe Slalom World Championships